Alex Mubiru is a Ugandan economist and public administrator, who was appointed Acting Director General in the Cabinet of the President of the African Development Bank (AfDB), effective 17 December 2021. He concurrently serves as the substantive Director of Strategy and Delivery, in the Office of the President of the AfDB, a position he has held since November 2020. He is based at the bank's headquarters in Abidjan,  Ivory Coast.

Background and education
Mubiru is a Ugandan national by birth. His late father, Joseph Mubiru, served as the Governor of the Bank of Uganda in the 1970s.

Alex Mubiru holds a Bachelor of Arts degree in Philosophy, Political Science and Economics from Macalester College, in Saint Paul, Minnesota, in the United States. His Master's Degree in Public Affairs and his Doctor of Philosophy degree in Public Affairs, were both awarded by Princeton University, in New Jersey, in the United States.

Career
He started out at the Thailand Development Research Institute (TDRI), working there as a Research Associate, in their International Economics Program, from 1994 until 1995. Later, from 1999 until 2001, he worked as the Project Economist for the World Bank, based at their Thailand Office.

Mubiru then spent the next nine years in academia. He was an Assistant Professor of Public Policy at the Lee Kuan Yew School of Public Policy at the National University of Singapore, from 2001 until 2008. He was then hired as Assistant Professor of Social Science, by the Singapore Management University from 2008 until 2009.

In 2009, he joined the AfDB as a Principal Research Economist. He then served as the Principal Country Economist, at the AfDB Country Office to Tanzania, serving there from 2010 until 2012. He was then assigned to the Strategy and Operations Policy Department, working there as the Lead Strategy Advisor, from 2012 until 2014. During this time, Mubiru was a member of the core team that oversaw the development of AfDB's Ten-Year Strategy (2013 to 2022) and was the "Task Manager" for the development of the AfDB's Private Sector Strategy (2013 to 2017).

Mubiru served as the Manager, Resource Mobilization Department at the AfDB, from 2014 until 2018. That year, he was appointed as the AfDB's Country Representative to the Republic of Tanzania, serving there until 2020. In November 2020, Akinwumi Adesina, the President of AfDB, appointed Mubiru to his Cabinet as Director of Strategy and Delivery.

Other considerations
In his capacity as Acting Director General at AfDB, Mubiru replaced Yacine Fal, a national of Senegal who was promoted to serve as Acting Vice President for Regional Development, Integration and Business Delivery, at AfDB.

See also
 Economy of Africa

References

External links
 Website of the African Development Bank

Living people
Ganda people
Ugandan economists
1970 births
Macalester College alumni
Princeton University alumni
People from Central Region, Uganda